Nintendo Badge Arcade, known in Japanese as , is a freemium application developed by Nintendo for the Nintendo 3DS, allowing players to customize the 3DS home menu with badges. The game launched in Japan in December 2014, and worldwide in November 2015.

Gameplay consisted of playing arcade crane-like games in hopes of acquiring badges, the game's main collectable. Badges were usually themed around other Nintendo properties, and once collected could be used to apply in the 3DS' HOME Menu. In addition to being decorative, some badges had special functions to them, such as launching applications and were compatible in other software as well.

In June 2017, it was announced that updates to the service would be discontinued, although the service itself is still operational. In March 2023, with the closure of the Nintendo 3DS eShop, it will no longer be possible to buy additional plays or themes, but free plays will still be available.

Gameplay
Nintendo Badge Arcade takes place in an arcade filled with machines known as badge catchers, each containing badges based on various Nintendo franchises such as Super Mario, Animal Crossing, The Legend of Zelda, Splatoon, and Pokémon (as well as third-party franchises such as Yo-Kai Watch and Mega Man) which are reorganised regularly. The arcade is hosted by a pink, anthropomorphic rabbit character called Arcade Bunny, who always greets the player, and often introduces promotional events. The badge catchers are viewed from a 2-D side-on perspective. Similar to real-life claw machines, players must move the catcher's crane using a button, pick up badges, and try and drop them off into a prize pit. They can accomplish this by simply picking them up, or use other techniques such as pushing them or causing landslides (this only works if there is a big pile of badges). Most badge catchers use a claw to pick up the badges, but some badge catchers use alternate means of obtaining badges. The hammer crane knocks badges to the right, the explosive crane blasts badges away in all directions, and the stick crane (which originally went unused, but was first revealed on April 28, 2016 in Japan) uses an extendable arm to move the badges. Any badges that the player obtains can be placed on the Nintendo 3DS's HOME Menu, with certain badges able to launch some of the 3DS's built-in applications. Most badges can also be used as decorations for the Swapdoodle messaging app.

First-time players begin the game with five free plays, after which they must purchase additional plays via the Nintendo eShop. Special themes for the HOME Menu, and one set of badges based on Arcade Bunny, can also be unlocked by purchasing enough plays during certain periods. Once per day, players can use the Practice Catcher to practice catching dummy badges. Players earn a free bonus play for every ten dummy badges they collect, plus additional plays should they uncover a bonus badge. Prior to the discontinuation of updates in 2017, additional plays could be available to the player through occasional events. Since discontinuing the updates, the game gives players two additional plays as a daily log-in bonus. These additional plays must be used when the game is loaded. All activities require a constant online connection as obtained badges are cloud saved via users' Nintendo Network ID.

Reception 
Nintendo Badge Arcade has received "mixed or average reviews" according to the review aggregator Metacritic.

Legacy

Arcade Bunny appears in Super Smash Bros. Ultimate as an Assist Trophy and Spirit. Two music tracks from this game are also included, being the title theme and Arcade Bunny's theme.

References

External links

2014 video games
Free-to-play video games
Nintendo 3DS eShop games
Nintendo 3DS-only games
Nintendo 3DS games
Nintendo games
Nintendo Network games
Single-player online games
Video games developed in Japan
Video games with downloadable content